SL2 RNA is a non-coding RNA involved in trans splicing in lower eukaryotes. Trans-splicing is a form of RNA processing. The acquisition of a spliced leader from an SL RNA is an inter-molecular reaction which precisely joins exons derived from separately transcribed RNAs. Approximately 25% of C. elegans genes are organised into polycistronic transcription units and the presence of SL2 on an mRNA is an indication the gene is in an operon.

References

External links 
 

Non-coding RNA